Gao Shengtai (died 1096) was the founder and the only emperor of the short-lived Dazhong Kingdom from 1094 until his death in 1096. He was from Cang Mountain in the present-day southern Chinese province of Yunnan.

Life 
In 1080, Duan Lianyi, the 12th ruler of the Dali Kingdom, was overthrown and killed by Yang Yizhen, who seized the throne from him. Gao Shengtai and his father, Gao Zhisheng, the Marquis of Shanchan (in present-day Kunming, Yunnan), led military forces to attack Yang Yizhen and defeated him. They restored the Dali monarchy by installing Duan Shouhui on the throne. 

However, in 1081, Gao Zhisheng and Gao Shengtai forced Duan Shouhui to abdicate and replaced him with Duan Zhengming. 

In 1094, Gao Shengtai forced Duan Zhengming to relinquish the throne to him, after which he renamed the Dali Kingdom to "Dazhong Kingdom" with the era name "Shangzhi".

Death 
He died of illness in 1096. Before his death, he instructed his son, Gao Taiming, to return the throne to the Duan family. Duan Zhengchun, Duan Zhengming's younger brother, became the new ruler and he restored the kingdom's former name. In spite of this power transition, Gao Shengtai's relatives and descendants still occupied highly influential positions in the Dali Kingdom after his death. Gao Shengtai was given the posthumous name "Emperor Fuyou Shengde Biaozheng".

In fiction

Gao Shengtai is fictionalised as a minor character in the wuxia  Demi-Gods and Semi-Devils by Louis Cha.

1096 deaths
Demi-Gods and Semi-Devils
Founding monarchs
Bai people
Dali Kingdom